Dannen is a surname. Notable people with the surname include:

 Fredric Dannen, American journalist and author
 Funny van Dannen (born 1958), German singer-songwriter

See also
 Danne
 Deneen
 Dineen
 Dinneen
 Dennen (disambiguation)